The Australia women's national rugby sevens team, are the Australia national rugby sevens team of women. They were champions of the inaugural Women's Sevens World Cup in 2009. The team plays in the World Rugby Women's Sevens Series as one of the "core teams" on the world tour, of which they have been crowned Champions three times. The team also played in the preceding competition to the current world series, the IRB Women's Sevens Challenge Cup. In 2016, they won the inaugural gold medal at the Rio Summer Olympics.

History

Team name 
The national sevens side is known as Australia and, as confirmed by captain Sharni Williams, does not have a nickname as of 2015. The team was sometimes referred to as the Pearls in sections of the media, but that name refers to Australia's developmental sevens side rather than the official national team. As of 2015, the developmental team also competes in the Pacific Games Sevens.

2022 
Australia won the 2021–22 Women's Sevens Series title, they then won the Commonwealth Games in Birmingham, and were later crowned champions of the Rugby World Cup Sevens completing 2022 with a historic clean sweep of every major tournament.

Honours
Australia has won the following:

World Rugby Sevens Series
 Champion: 2016, 2018, 2022
 Runner-up: 2014, 2017, 2020

World Cup Sevens
 Champion: 2009, 2022

Rugby sevens at the Summer Olympics
 Gold medal: 2016

Rugby sevens at the Commonwealth Games
 Gold medal: 2022
 Silver medal: 2018

Major tournament wins
Australia Sevens: 2018
Brazil Sevens: 2014, 2016
Canada Sevens: 2022
Dubai Sevens: 2013, 2015, 2017, 2021I, 2021II, 2022
Hong Kong Sevens: 2009
London Sevens: 2016
Spain Sevens: 2022II
United States Sevens: 2016

Regional tournament wins
Oceania Sevens: 2008, 2013, 2016, 2018, 2019
 Asia-Pacific Championship: 2012

In 2016 the Australian women's sevens team was named Team of the Year at the Australian Institute of Sport Performance Awards.

Current squad
Squad named for the 2023 World Rugby HSBC Sevens Series in Vancouver from the 3–5 March.

Caps updated to the latest date: 5 March 2023

Tournament record
A red box around the year indicates tournaments played within Australia

World Cup Sevens

Commonwealth Games

Pacific Games

Olympic Games

Oceania Women's Sevens 

Notes:
 Australia VII or development team entered

World Series record

2010s

2020s

Players

 Madison Ashby
 Lauren Brown
 Rhiannon Byers
 Charlotte Caslick
 Ellia Green
 Yasmin Meakes
 Sariah Paki
 Shannon Parry
 Evania Pelite
 Alicia Lucas
 Cassie Staples
 Emma Tonegato
 Sharni Williams
 Lily Dick

Previous squads

Captains

Coaches

See also

Australia women's national rugby union team
National Rugby Sevens Championships
National Women's Rugby Championship
Super W
Women's rugby union in Australia

References

External links
Official website
WorldRugby profile

Women's national rugby sevens teams
Sevens
Rugby sevens in Australia
World Rugby Women's Sevens Series core teams